Rachel Carson Run is a  long tributary of the Allegheny River located in Allegheny County in the U.S. state of Pennsylvania.

Rachel Carson Run flows through Harrison Hills Park and joins the Allegheny River within Harrison Township.

The stream is named after ecologist Rachel Carson.

See also

 List of rivers of Pennsylvania
 List of tributaries of the Allegheny River

References

External links

U.S. Geological Survey: PA stream gaging stations

Rivers of Pennsylvania
Tributaries of the Allegheny River
Rivers of Allegheny County, Pennsylvania
Run